This list identifies active and former maritime vessels of the Irish state, both civilian and military. This list is incomplete.

Currently Active

Irish Naval Service

Garda Síochána

Revenue Commissioners

Marine Institute

Geological Survey of Ireland

Commissioners of Irish Lights

See also
 Irish Naval Service
 Irish Coast Guard

References 

 
Irelan